Kanji is a village in the Leh district of the union territory of Ladakh in India. It is located in the Khalsi tehsil, and can be accessed through the village of Heniskot which lies on the Srinagar-Kargil-Leh highway.

The village has a small number of families who farm the immediate area. The village is situated on an altitude of 3875 m, and is a campsite on the Kanji la and Shilakong gorge treks.

Demographics 
According to the 2011 census of India, Kanji has 52 households. The effective literacy rate (i.e. the literacy rate of population excluding children aged 6 and below) is 62.19%.

References 

Villages in Khalsi tehsil